Hennon is a surname. Notable people with the surname include:

Don Hennon (born c. 1938), American basketball player
John Hennon, 15th-century Dutch philosopher
Rodney Hennon (born 1969), American baseball player and coach

See also
Hennon Stadium, a baseball venue in Cullowhee, North Carolina, United States